The discography of Rebecca St. James, a contemporary Christian musician, consists of ten studio albums, two live albums, five extended plays, and nine compilation albums.

Studio albums

Live albums

Extended plays

Compilation albums

DVDs & Videos

Singles

Billboard singles

Radio singles

Music videos
 "Side By Side" (1994)
 "God" (1996)
 "You're the Voice" (1996)
 "O Come All Ye Faithful" (1997)
 "Pray" (1998)
 "Reborn" (2000)
 "Wait For Me" (2001)
 "Song of Love" (2002)
 "I Thank You" (2003)
 "Expressions of Your Love" (2003)
 "Yes, I Believe In God" (2005)
 "God Help Me" (2007)
 "Forgive Me" (2007)
 "Kingdom Come" (2021)

References

External links

Christian music discographies
Discographies of American artists
Discographies of Australian artists
Pop music discographies